Laurie Hays is an American journalist at Bloomberg News, where she currently serves as senior executive editor for beat reporting. Prior to joining Bloomberg, Hays worked at The Wall Street Journal for 23 years as a reporter, Moscow correspondent, and editor, and she worked on a team that won a 2003 Pulitzer Prize in Explanatory Reporting on corporate corruption scandals.

Early life

Hays was raised in Greenwich, Connecticut. She attended Phillips Exeter Academy in high school and wrote for The Exonian, becoming the first female editor at the weekly student newspaper. Hays graduated from Harvard in 1979 with an honors degree in American history, and she wrote for The Harvard Crimson during college.

After college, Hays took a job with the New Orleans States-Item, which merged a year later with the New Orleans Times-Picayune. Her work covered the Plaquemines and St. Bernard parishes, where she covered murder and politics, including stories on political boss Leander Perez. In 1983, Hays was hired as a reporter for The News Journal in Wilmington.

References

Living people
American women journalists
Bloomberg L.P. people
The Wall Street Journal people
Pulitzer Prize for Explanatory Journalism winners
People from Greenwich, Connecticut
Phillips Exeter Academy alumni
The Harvard Crimson people
Year of birth missing (living people)
21st-century American women